This is a list of crises situations and major protests in countries of Europe since the year 2000.

2022 

 Russian full-scale invasion of Ukraine starting from February 24, 2022.
 2022 energy crises in Europe
 2021–2022 Belarus–European Union border crisis (ongoing)
 2022 Oslo shooting

2021 
 2021 Dutch curfew riots
 Protest and strikes of the CGT union 2021
 2021 Russian protests
 2021 Montenegrin episcopal enthronement protests
 2021 North Kosovo crisis
 2021 Abkhazia unrest
 2021–2022 Belarus–European Union border crisis (ongoing)

2020 
 COVID-19 pandemic in Europe
 2020–2021 Bulgarian protests
 2020–2021 Belarusian protests

2019 

 2019 Moscow protests
 2019–2020 Maltese protests
 2019–2020 Catalan protests
 Sardines movement

2018 

 2018–2022 UK higher education strikes
 2018 Slovak anti-government protests after murder of journalist Ján Kuciak
 Yellow Vests movement

2017
2017–2018 Spanish constitutional crisis
2017–2019 Romanian protests
2017 Serbian protests
2017–2018 Russian protests
2017 Belarusian protests

2015
European migrant crisis (2015–ongoing)
November 2015 Paris attacks

2014
2014 Ukrainian revolution, 2014 pro-Russian unrest in Ukraine and the subsequent ongoing War in Eastern Ukraine
2014 unrest in Bosnia and Herzegovina (4–10 February 2014)

2013
Euromaidan, a wave of demonstrations and civil unrest in Ukraine
Romanian protests against the Roșia Montană Project
2013 Stockholm riots
Bulgarian anti-monopoly protests and demonstrations against the Oresharski cabinet

2012
Greek labour unions continue strikes.
Violent protests in Romania in January
Ongoing protest activity in Russia
Slovenian protests in Slovenia (2012-2013)

2011 
2011 Northern Ireland riots (20 June–16 July)
2011 UK public sector strikes (30 November), 2 million public sector workers strike over pensions
2011 England riots (6–11 August), thousands of people of the lower socio-economic group riot
North Kosovo crisis (July–December), involving ethnic Serb demonstrators in North Kosovo against Republic of Kosovo Police and KFOR
2011 Germany E. coli O104:H4 outbreak (May–June)
Thousands of protesters hold demonstrations in Belgrade, Serbia against the arrest of Ratko Mladić (26 May).
2011 Portuguese protests (12 March)
Nationwide protests across Spain (May–)
Anti-cuts protest in London (26 March)
Refugees of the 2011 Libyan civil war (March–)
Nationwide protests and strikes in Greece continue throughout 2011.
Domodedovo International Airport bombing (24 January)
Major Russian protests begin in response to the 2011 Russian legislative election.
2011 Norway attacks (22 July)

2010 
 Emergency state in Spain on December
 European sovereign debt crisis
 Suicide bombing in Stockholm on 11 December, the first ever suicide attack in the Nordic countries
 Student protests across the United Kingdom since November
 Student protest in Dublin on 3 November
 Pension reform strikes across France during September and October (still ongoing)
 Pride March is held in Belgrade, Serbia and Serbian protestors (mainly Obraz) clash with the riot police to try to disrupt the parade
 Alumina sludge spill in Ajka, Hungary, on 4 October
 French Romani repatriation in July
 Nationwide protests across Greece in May
 Air travel disruption after the 2010 Eyjafjallajökull eruption in April and May
 Metro suicide bombings in Moscow on 29 March

2009 
 Flu pandemic
 Protests at the G-20 summit in London in April
 Riot in Riga, Latvia, on 13 January
 Riots involving Bosnian football clubs NK Široki Brijeg and FK Sarajevo
 Anti-Israel riots in Oslo in January, continuing from December 2008
 Protests in Iceland in response to the country's financial crisis
 Unibrennt student protests in Austria
 Protest and riot in Vilnius, Lithuania, on 16 January

2008 
 Energy crisis in Bulgaria
 Riots in Greece in December
 Presidential election protests in Armenia
 Protests in Belgrade, Serbia following the declaration of Kosovo's independence
 Karadžić arrest sparks riots in Belgrade, Serbia.
 Rioting in Manchester before, during and after the 2008 UEFA Cup Final
 Armed conflict between Georgia on one side and Russia, South Ossetia and Abkhazia on the other
 2008 unrest in Kosovo

2007 
 Riots beginning 26 November in Val-d'Oise, France, following the deaths of two teenagers in a traffic collision with a police vehicle
 Anti-government protests in Georgia
 Global spread of H5N1
 Anti-Putin protests in St. Petersburg and Moscow beginning 24 November
 Football violence in Catania, Italy, in which one police officer was killed
 Bronze Night riots in Tallinn in April
 Attempted car bombings in London on 29 June
 Attempted suicide attack on Glasgow Airport on 30 June, Scotland's first ever terrorist attack
 Eviction and demolition of the Ungdomshuset in Nørrebro of Copenhagen, March 2007

2006 
 Youth protests across France from February to April
 Riots in Dublin on 25 February
 Anti-government protests across Hungary from 17 September to 23 October
 Immigrant youth riots in Brussels following the unexplained death of a Moroccan local in police custody
 Riot in Copenhagen

2005 
 Riots derived from racial tensions in Birmingham, England, on 22 and 23 October
 Civil unrest by suburban youth across France
 Suicide bombings on 7 July and attempted bombings on 21 July in London

2004 
 Commuter train bombings in Madrid on 11 March
 Metro suicide bombing in Moscow on 6 February
 Violent unrest in Kosovo in March
 Orange Revolution in Ukraine beginning in November
 Beslan school massacre in North Ossetia

2003 
 Rose Revolution in Georgia in November
 Truck bomb attacks in Istanbul on 15 and 20 November

2002 
 Moscow theater hostage crisis from 23 to 26 October

2001 
 Gothenburg riots during European Council and EU-US summit from 14 to 16 June
 2001 Oldham riots
 2001 Harehills riot
 2001 Bradford riots
 Pride March in Belgrade, Serbia is brought to an end by Serbian protestors

2000 
 Overthrow of Slobodan Milošević in Belgrade, Serbia
 Russian submarine Kursk explosion on 12 August
 Baia Mare cyanide spill in Romania on 30 January
 Czech TV crisis beginning in late 2000 and continuing until early 2001

See also 

 Global economic crisis
 2007–2008 world food price crisis
 2000s energy crisis
 Effects of the 2000s energy crisis
 Automotive industry crisis of 2008–2010
 Global crisis
 Social situation in the French suburbs
 Causes of the late-2000s recession
 Late-2000s recession in Europe
 2010 European sovereign debt crisis timeline
 Late-2000s recession
 Financial crisis of 2007–2008
 Russia–Ukraine gas disputes
 Fuel protests in the United Kingdom
 2008 European Union stimulus plan
 History of Europe

History of Europe
Protests
Riots and civil disorder in Europe
2000s in Europe
2010s in Europe